is an EP by the Japanese pop music duo ClariS, released on March 2, 2016 by SME Records. The EP contains five music tracks, four of which are covers.

Release and reception
Spring Tracks: Haru no Uta was released on March 2, 2016 in a regular edition and a limited edition bundled with five postcards featuring illustrations of ClariS by various artists. For the week of February 29, 2016 on Oricon's weekly albums chart, Spring Tracks: Haru no Uta was reported to have sold 7,503 copies in its first week of sales, peaking at No. 8, and charted for six weeks.

Track listing

References

2016 EPs
J-pop EPs
Japanese-language EPs
Sony Music EPs
ClariS albums